Vane Hungerford Pennell (16 August 1876 – 17 June 1938) was an English rackets and real tennis player who competed in the 1908 Summer Olympics for Great Britain.

Life
Vane Pennell was educated at Eton, Charterhouse and Trinity College, Cambridge.
He won the 1904 amateur tennis championship and the 1907 gold prize at Lords. In the 1908 Olympics he won the gold medal in the men's doubles competition together with John Jacob Astor. In the men's singles event he lost his first match.

He also competed in the Olympic jeu de paume tournament but was eliminated in the quarter-finals.

References

External links
Vane Pennell at Flickr Commons
profile
Olympic profile

1876 births
1938 deaths
People educated at Eton College
People educated at Charterhouse School
Racquets players
Olympic racquets players of Great Britain
Olympic real tennis players of Great Britain
Racquets players at the 1908 Summer Olympics
Jeu de paume players at the 1908 Summer Olympics
English Olympic medallists
Olympic gold medallists for Great Britain
Alumni of Trinity College, Cambridge
Medalists at the 1908 Summer Olympics